Football Club Municipal d'Aubervilliers (commonly referred to as Aubervilliers or simply Aubervilliers) is a French association football club based in Aubervilliers, a suburb of Paris. The club was founded in 1948 and currently plays in the Championnat National 3, the fifth level of French football following relegation from the Championnat de France Amateur at the end of the 2015–16 season. Aubervilliers plays its home matches at the Stade André Karman located within the city. The stadium is named after former French politician André Karman who was born in the commune. The team is presided over by Farid Maachi and managed by Rachid Yousef.

Players

Current squad 
As of 22 February 2020.

Notable players 

Below are the current notable players who have either started their careers at Aubervillers or represented the club in league and international competition since the club's foundation in 1948. To appear in the section below, a player must have started their career at the club and later went on to play for their respective national team or played in at least 80 official matches for the club. 

For a complete list of Aubervilliers players, see :Category:FCM Aubervilliers players.

 Abou Diaby
 Steve Marlet
 Sébastien Michalowski

Honours 
Division 3
Winners (1): 1993 (East Group)
Championnat de France Amateur 2
Winners (1): 2010 (Group B)
Division d'Honneur (Paris Île-de-France)
Champions (2): 1990, 2009

References

External links 

Association football clubs established in 1948
Football clubs in Paris
1948 establishments in France
Sport in Seine-Saint-Denis